Excessivism  is an art movement. In 2015 American artist and curator Kaloust Guedel introduced it to the world with an exhibition titled Excessivist Initiative.
The review of the exhibition written by art critic and curator Shana Nys Dambrot, titled "Excessivism: Irony, Imbalance and a New Rococo" was published in the Huffington Post. Its early adopters go back to late 20th century.

Concept

Excessivism is a reflection, examination, or investigation of every aspect of life in excessive state with particular consideration of areas that have real and consequential effect on members of society.  Subject areas include, but are not limited to, economics, politics and psychology. Its economic criticism is a commentary on economic materialism. It reflects, examines and investigates the excessive desire to acquire material goods beyond one's needs (and often means).

Excessivism depicts the excessive use of resources in an exaggerated way using two- or three-dimensional visual creations, written or spoken words, or in any other medium. It aims to reflect, examine, or investigate the capitalist system, devoid of aesthetic, legal, commercial, ethical, moral, racial, or religious considerations.

History 

The inaugural exhibition of Excessivism took place in LA Artcore Brewery Annex gallery with the title "Excessivist Initiative". And the Excessivism Manifesto was published in Downtown News weekly in September 2015. According to an art critic Shana Nys Dambrot, the idea was conceived in the studio of the founder based on his personal realizations of his relationship as a consumer with the capitalist environment.  Excessivism was introduced to the Los Angeles art scene in November 2014 in the Red Pipe gallery in an  exhibition titled Excess The New Norm. It was curated by art critic, publisher and curator Mat Gleason.

The inaugural exhibition included works by Brett Baker, Christophe Baudson, Andrew Dadson, Ian Davenport, Jonas Etter, Kaloust Guedel, Don Harger, Zhu Jinshi, Fabian Marcacio, Roxy Paine, Scott Richter, Samvel Saghatelian, Elizabeth Sheppell, Michael Toenges, Michael Villarreal, Danh Vō, Cullen Washington, Jr., Brigid Watson, Leslie Wayne, Ai Weiwei and Zadik Zadikian.

By 2019, Excessivism expanded beyond visual forms to include fashion and music.

In the year of 1910, writer and critic Roland Dorgelès submitted three paintings under the name of Joachim-Raphaël Boronali from Genoa to the Salon des Indépendants in Paris, as if it were part of the “Excessivism” movement, which did not exist. The paintings were produced by Roland Dorgelès and a few other jokesters by attaching a paintbrush to the tail of a donkey named Lolo. At the time, the hoax was taken seriously by Paris art critics.

Bibliography

Fashion Thinking: Creative Approaches to the Design Process, by Fiona Dieffenbacher, 2021 
Adidas Originas by Ji Won Choi Releases Second Collection, Adidas News, July 17, 2019
Art As Commodities As Art, Inbal Strauss, June 14, 1019
A Dude Aikes, "Nothing Lasts... 'Forever Bicycles' Sculpture Departs Austin, Texas", May 23, 2019 
Paraphernalia: Material Agency and Musical Excess", Larry Goves Bath Spa Composers, January 7, 2019
Excessivism, Ranch Soil: music released September 28, 2019
Excessivism, Krolik: music released October 10, 2018
The journey of the most controversial Chinese Artist and Activist – Ai Weiwei, DoerLife, by Rukshana K 
Ethically Chic: Designer Ji Won Choi Gets Deep About Sustainable Fashion, Hong Kong Tatler, by Isabel Wong, May 31, 2018
Week 2 - AOTW 2 - Ai Weiwei, Art 110, by Salim Qafaiti, October 1, 2017 
Artists on the Cutting Edge, by Addison Fach, December 1, 2017
Art & Museum, Pg. 48, Autumn 2017
Ji Won Choi "Shows with Adidas for London Fashion Week Presentation", Snobette, February 17, 2019
Emerging Designer Ji Won Choi: Between Excessivism and Sustainable Fashion, The Fashionatlas, by Lidia La Rocca, 28 September 2017
Vogue, "This Parsons x Kering Empowering Imagination Finalist Is Tackling the Excesses of Overconsumption Head On", May 8, 2017, by Nicole Phelps
'EXCESSIVISM: A Visual Representation of Over-Consumption, by MORGAN STUART NOVEMBER 26, 2017
'Medium, "Artists on the Cutting Edge",
HiSoUR, "Excessivism, Art Element Society"  
Diversions LA, February 8, 2017, by Genie Davis
"La Pietra Dialogues", Ai Weiwei.Libero: A Contemporary Revolutionary, by Nana Apraku, Sep. 26, 2016
Artcopyblog, Kaloust Guedel's Excessivism and the Rise of Donald Trump", by Brenda Haroutunian, JUNE 26, 2016
WideWalls Magazine, "Excessivism – A Phenomenon Every Art Collector Should Know", by Angie Kordic, January 2016
weebly, Week 2 – AOTW 2 – Ai Weiwei, June 10, 2017
SUSTAINABILITY vs EXCESSIVISM", Fauve Penketh, 2017Your Observer, "Chinese Artist Ai Weiwei Used More Than 400,000 Legos to Create His Piece Focused on the Chinese Zodiac", by Brynn MechemLolo the Donkey and the Avant-Garde That Never Was: Part 1, by Kevin Buist, March 30, 2016
Asbarez, (Armenian), by Ani Tadevosyan, January 13, 2016Gallereo Magazine, "The Newest Art Movement You've Never Heard Of", Nov. 20, 2015
CaliforniaNewswire, New Art Movement, Excessivism, Is a Commentary on Economic Materialism, Nov. 02, 2015Downtown News, Excessivism Manifesto, September 28, 2015, page 10Kaloust Guedel: Excessivist Initiative, Curate LA, Oct., 2015Excessivism: Irony, Imbalance and a New Rococo. The Huffington Post. Retrieved 2015-10-12.Picasso And The Chess Player'', by Larry Witham, 2013

References

External links
Official website

Contemporary art movements
Postmodern art
Remodernism
Theories of aesthetics
21st century in art
Visual arts genres